was a king of the Ryukyu Kingdom from 1835 to 1847.  He was the eldest son of Shō Kō. According to Chūzan Seifu, he was appointed regent in 1828, in place of his ailing father who was supposedly afflicted by a mental illness. Shō Kō died in 1834, and Shō Iku was installed as the king.

Shō Iku was a Confucian scholar, and had dedicated his life to education. But during his reign, the financial crisis grew more and more serious. When a French ship arrived in Naha in 1844, Ryukyu was forced to trade with France. It was the first contact with Western countries. Théodore-Augustin Forcade, a French priest sent by Paris Foreign Missions Society, came to Ryukyu to spread the Christian Gospel. Bernard Jean Bettelheim, a British Protestant missionary, also arrived in Ryukyu in 1846. Bettelheim established the first foreign hospital on the island at the Naminoue Gokoku-ji Temple.

The king died in 1847, and his second son Shō Tai succeeded him as the last king of the Ryukyu Kingdom.

References

1813 births
1847 deaths
19th-century calligraphers
Kings of Ryūkyū
Second Shō dynasty